"Delete Forever" is a single recorded by Canadian musician Grimes. It was released on February 12, 2020, under the label 4AD as the fifth and final single off of her fifth studio album, Miss Anthropocene. The song is a folk, Britpop, and dance composition.

Background
In an interview with Zane Lowe for Apple Music's Beats 1, Grimes revealed that "Delete Forever" was written on the night of American rapper Lil Peep's death, while its lyrics were inspired by the death of the singer's friends due to opioid addiction.

Composition
"Delete Forever" is an "earnest and heartbreaking" and "folkily melodic" acoustic ballad, which employs a banjo, strings, "incredibly clean" acoustic guitar, electronic drums and bass. In an interview with Zane Lowe for Apple Music's Beats 1, Grimes described "Delete Forever" as a "pretty bummer song [...] about the opioid epidemic". Sonically, the record "incorporates folk, Britpop, and dance".

Music video
On February 12, 2020, the song's music video premiered on YouTube. It depicts the singer in "brightly-colored pigtails and ethereal makeup" playing "a queen looking over her crumbling empire". Grimes revealed that the video was based on the fourth volume of the Japanese cyberpunk manga Akira, while its setting was created in a 3D modelling program.

Charts

References

Grimes songs
2020 songs
2020 singles
4AD singles
Songs about drugs
Songs about heroin
Commemoration songs